Beaujeu is a commune of the Rhône department in eastern France.

It lies between Mâcon and Lyon.

Beaujeu gives its name to the famous wine region of Beaujolais (Biôjolês), a former province of France of which it is the historical capital. However it was overtaken in the 14th century by Villefranche-sur-Saône, which remains the main commercial centre of the region.

History
Beaujolais was a semi-autonomous fiefdom of the Lords of Beaujeu. The barony was acquired in the 9th century by Guillaume, Comte du Lyonnais and Count of Forez; on his death, his son Bérard became the first Lord of Beaujeu.

List of rulers
Lords:
 Berard of Beaujeu + c. 966
 Guichard I of Beaujeu c. 966-977
 Humbert I of Beaujeu + c. 977-1016
 Guichard II of Beaujeu c. 1016-1050
 Guichard III of Beaujeu c. 1050-1070
 Humbert II of Beaujeu c. 1070-1102
 Guichard IV of Beaujeu 1102-1137
 Humbert III of Beaujeu 1137-1174
 Humbert IV of Beaujeu 1174-1202
 Guichard V le Grand of Beaujeu 1202-1216
 Humbert V of Beaujeu 1216-1250
 Isabelle de Beaujeu 1250-1297 (married Renaud)
 Renaud I of Forez, count of Forez 1250-1297
 Louis de Beaujeu 1250-1295
 Guichard VI of Beaujeu 1295-1331
 Edouard I of Beaujeu 1331-1351 (Marshal of France)
 Antoine of Beaujeu 1351-1374
 Edouard II of Beaujeu 1374-1400 (+1400 without succession)

After the death of Edouard II, the barony passed to his uncle Louis II, Duke of Bourbon and was used as a title first by members of the Bourbon family and then by the House of Orléans. In 1522, Francis I of France confiscated the title and gave it to his mother Louise of Savoy, but it reverted to the French crown on her death in 1531.

See also

 Régnié
 Communes of the Rhône department

References

Communes of Rhône (department)
Beaujolais (province)